This is a list of members of the Tasmanian Legislative Council between 1969 and 1975. Terms of the Legislative Council did not coincide with Legislative Assembly elections, and members served six year terms, with a number of members facing election each year.

Elections

Members

Notes

  On 7 October 1971, Walter Davis, the member for West Devon, died. William Young won the resulting by-election on 11 December 1971.
  In April 1974, Michael Hodgman, the member for Huon, resigned to contest the seat of Denison in the Australian House of Representatives. His brother Peter Hodgman won the resulting by-election on 25 May 1974.

Sources
 
 Parliament of Tasmania (2006). The Parliament of Tasmania from 1856

Members of Tasmanian parliaments by term
20th-century Australian politicians